Quararibea is a genus of flowering plants in the family Malvaceae.

Species include:

Quararibea asterolepis
Quararibea aurantiocalyx
Quararibea cordata
Quararibea dolichopoda
Quararibea dolichosiphon
Quararibea funebris
Quararibea gomeziana
Quararibea jefensis
Quararibea pendula
Quararibea platyphylla
Quararibea pterocalyx
Quararibea sanblasensis
Quararibea santaritensis
Quararibea turbinata – swizzlestick tree
Quararibea velutina
Quararibea yunckeri

References

 
Malvaceae genera